Celebrators of Becoming is a Therion box-set released on 5 May 2006. It contains 4 DVDs and 2 audio discs. It is available in two versions: The luxury digipak version in a slip case and the cheaper non-digipak version. Both versions contain all discs. Cover artwork was made by Thomas Ewerhard.

Content

DVD: Disc 1
Live video from Mexico City, 2004.

 "Intro"
 "Blood of Kingu"
 "Uthark Runa"
 "Seven Secrets of the Sphinx"
 "Asgård"
 "Son of the Sun"
 "Invocation of Naamah"
 "Typhon"
 "Draconian Trilogy"
 "Flesh of the Gods"
 "Schwarzalbenheim"
 "Ginnungagap"
 "In Remembrance"
 "Wild Hunt"
 "The Invincible"
 "Melez"
 "Rise of Sodom and Gomorrah"
 "The Khlysti Evangelist"
 "Siren of the Woods"
 "Quetzalcoatl"
 "Wine of Aluqah"
 "Cults of the Shadow"
 "To Mega Therion"
 "Iron Fist" (Motörhead cover)
 "Outro"

DVD: Disc 2
Bands' documentary from the 2004-2006 World Tour (North and South America, Europe and Asia).

Latin America, 2004

 Guadalajara, Mexico:
 "Soundcheck Guadalajara" – 1:19

 El Salvador:
 "Before Show" – 0:32
 "Stage Excerpt Seven Secrets" / "Atlantis" / "Siren" – 5:10
 "After Show" – 0:28

 Colombia:
 "Blood of Kingu" – 5:28
 "Rise of Sodom and Gomorrah" – 6:50

 Bolivia:
 "A Day in La Paz" – 22:22
 "Wine of Aluqah" – 4:47

North America, 2005

 Chicago, U.S.:
 "Seven Secrets of the Sphinx" – 3:58
 "Black Sun" – 5:29

 Quebec City, Canada:
 "Wine of Aluqah" – 5:05
 "Black Funeral" – 2:58

East Europe, 2004-2006

 Moscow, Russia:
 "Russian Anthem" – 1:26

 Kyiv, Ukraine:
 "I Wanna Be Somebody" – 4:18

 Bucharest, Romania:
 "Black Funeral" – 3:16
 "Iron Fist" – 4:20

 Ankara, Turkey:
 "Singing a’ Capella in the Dark" – 3:52
 "Drumming in the Dark" – 3:42

Europe, 2004

 Vienna, Austria:
 "Khlysti Evangelist" – 4:42

 Paris, France:
 "Uthark Runa" – 4:48
 "Asgård" – 4:02
 "The Crowning of Atlantis" – 5:12
 "The invincible" – 5:17

 Antwerp, Belgium:
 "Melez" – 4:13

 Strasbourg, France:
 "Uthark Runa" – 5:02

 Stuttgart, Germany:
 "Backstage" – 0:31
 "Uthark Runa" – 4:51

 Budapest, Hungary:
 "Typhon" – 5:28
 "Cults of the Shadow" – 5:19

 Warsaw, Poland:
 "Siren of the Woods" – 4:52

 Pratteln, Switzerland:
 "Iron Fist" – 3:33

 Toulouse, France:
 "Caffeine" – 6:03 (As Trail of Tears guests)
 "Rise of Sodom and Gommorrah" – 6:33
 "Cults of the Shadow" / "To Mega Therion" / "Black Funeral" / "Iron Fist" – 15:12

DVD: Disc 3

Live at Wacken Open Air, 2001
 "Seven Secrets of the Sphinx"
 "The Invocation of Naamah"
 "Cults of the Shadow"
 "Birth of Venus Illegitima"
 "In the Desert of Set"
 "The Rise of Sodom and Gomorrah"
 "Wine of Aluqah"
 "To Mega Therion"

Smecky Studios
Recorded in Prague, Czech Republic.
 "Recording Choir for 'Quetzalcoath' and 'Blood of Kingu'" – 2:18
 "Chris Follow Notes" – 0:27
 "Harpsichord Close Up" – 0:12
 "Recording Orchestra" – 2:33
 "Recording solo tenor for 'Khlysti evangelist'" – 0:33

Sun Studio and Vor Frelsers Church
Recorded in Copenhagen, Denmark.
 "Recording Hammond Organ" – 2:50
 "Introducing the Mellotron" – 6:14
 "Recording Mellotron" – 1:18
 "Close Up Upon and Soundcheck of Church Organ" – 2:27
 "Recording Church Organ" – 1:23
 "Checking Result of Church Organ Recording" – 2:34
 "Planning Mix" – 0:55
 "Mixing "Son of the Sun"" – 4:10
 "Mixing "Lemuria"" – 0:53

Studio report
Modern Art Studio, Stockholm, Sweden.
 "Drums and Guitar" – 21:17
 "Mandolin Test of Harmonies" – 0:35
 "Mandolin Recordings" – 5:45
 "Piotr Entfesselt" – 4:50
 "Dreams of Piotrenborg" – 1:08

Music videos
All of the band's music videos to date:

 "Pandemonic Outbreak" (1992)
 "A Black Rose" (1993)
 "The Beauty in Black" (1995)
 "To Mega Therion" (1996)
 "In the Desert of Set" (1997)
 "Birth of Venus Illegitima" (1998)
 "Summernight City" (2001)

The disc also contains the art movie "The Golden Embrace" (Christofer Johnsson composed music for this movie on the A'arab Zaraq - Lucid Dreaming album) including director's comments.

DVD: Disc 4
Historical disc, which contains a collection of bootlegs from 1989 to 2001 with comments of band members.

 Strömstad, Sweden, 1989:
 "Paroxysmal Holocaust"

 Of Darkness... - Rinkeby, Sweden, 1989:
 "Asphyxiate with Fear"

 ''Of Darkness... - Helsinki, Finland, 1990: "Dark Eternity"

 Of Darkness... - Huddinge, Sweden, 1992: "The Return"

 Beyond Sanctorum - Borås, Sweden, 1992: "Enter the Depths of Eternal Darkness"

 Beyond Sanctorum - Uppsala, Sweden, 1992: "Pandemonic Outbreak"

 Ho Drakon Ho Megas tour - Huddinge, Sweden, 1993: "Dawn of Persihness"

 Zug, Switzerland, 1994: "Baal Reginon"

 Lepaca Kliffoth separate show in Buenos Aires, Argentina, 1995: "Wings of the Hydra"
 "Melez"
 "Symphony of the Dead"
 "A Black Rose"
 "Dark Princess Naamah"
 "Let the New Day Begin"
 "Dawn of Perishness"
 "Black"

 Theli tour - Vilnius, Lithuania, 1996: "Cults of the Shadow"

 Theli tour 2 - Thessaloniki, Greece, 1997: "To Mega Therion"

 Vovin tour - Porto, Portugal, 1998: "Rise of Sodom and Gomorrah"
 "Black Sun"

 Deggial separate show in Mexico, 2000: "Enter Vril-Ya"

 Deggial tour - Vilnius, Lithuania, 2000: "Behind the Scenes: Before a Show"
 "Riders of Theli"
 "The Niemann Brothers' Jam"
 "To Mega Therion"
 "The Wings of the Hydra"
 "Behind the Scenes: After a Show"

 Secret of the Runes'' tour - La Paz, Bolivia, 2001:
 "Seawinds"
 "Asgård"
 "Secret of the Runes"
 "Summernight City"
 "Beauty in Black"

 Behind the Scenes 1:
 Budapest, Hungary and Hamburg, Germany

Live in Mexico City
Both discs contains live audio from Mexico City, 2004.

CD one
 "Intro" – 0:27
 "Blood of Kingu" – 5:26
 "Uthark Runa" – 5:33
 "Seven Secrets of the Sphinx" – 3:45
 "Asgård" – 4:32
 "Son of the Sun" – 5:43
 "Invocation of Naamah" – 5:38
 "Typhon" – 4:37
 "Draconian Trilogy" – 6:43
 "Flesh of the Gods" – 4:11
 "Schwarzalbenheim" – 3:33
 "Ginnungagap" – 5:13

CD two
 "In Remembrance" – 6:34
 "Wild Hunt" – 4:01
 "The Invincible" – 5:22
 "Melez" – 3:59
 "Rise of Sodom and Gomorrah" – 6:52
 "The Khlysti Evangelist" – 4:53
 "Siren of the Woods" – 9:58
 "Quetzalcoatl" – 3:38
 "Wine of Aluqah" – 4:46
 "Cults of the Shadow" – 5:19
 "To Mega Therion" – 7:09
 "Iron Fist" – 5:14

Release details

References

External links
 
 Information about album at the official website

2006 compilation albums
Therion (band) compilation albums
2006 live albums
2006 video albums
Live video albums
Nuclear Blast compilation albums
Nuclear Blast live albums
Nuclear Blast video albums